George Boyd may refer to:

George Boyd (footballer) (born 1985), Scottish footballer
George Boyd (playwright) (1952–2020), Canadian playwright
George Milward Boyd (1851–1940), Canadian politician
George Boyd (potter) (1825–1886), New Zealand potter
George W. Boyd, American politician

See also
George Boyd-Rochfort (1880–1940), Irish recipient of the Victoria Cross